Prestbury railway station is a station which serves the village of Prestbury, Cheshire, England. It was opened on 24 November 1845 by the London & North Western Railway.

Facilities
There is a car park and ticket machine at the station. The southbound platform is only accessible via footbridge. Both platforms have waiting shelters. Previously, there was a payphone on platform 2; this was removed in May 2019.

Service pattern
From 14 December 2008 trains operate on an hourly pattern, terminating at Stoke-on-Trent (southbound) or Manchester Piccadilly (northbound). Some early morning, peak and late night services originate/terminate at Macclesfield.

There are five services in each direction on Sundays.

References

External links

Railway stations in Cheshire
DfT Category F1 stations
Former London and North Western Railway stations
Railway stations in Great Britain opened in 1845
Northern franchise railway stations